Amay Khurasiya  (born 18 May 1972) is a former Indian cricketer. He played as a left-handed batsman and a slow left-arm bowler.

Career 

Khurasiya, a left-handed batsman, has the rare distinction of clearing the Civil Services Examination  before he made his debut for India. As of today he is an Inspector in Indian Customs & Central Excise Department.

His first class career stretches back to 1989/90, and includes seventeen consecutive seasons (1990–91 to 2005–06). He made his ODI debut with a brisk 57 off 45 balls against Sri Lanka at Pune in
the Pepsi Cup tri-nations tournament in 1999 which also involved Pakistan. He played 10
of his 12 ODIs in 1999.

He was included in the 1999 Indian World Cup squad, but didn't get a chance to play in any match in the tournament.

In 2001, he made a comeback into ODIs by playing two more matches against Sri Lanka in a tri-series without much success. He never played for India again.

Retirement 

Amay Khurasiya announced his retirement from first class cricket on 22 April 2007 after he was dropped from Madhya Pradesh Ranji team. He told reporters he would continue to serve the game through coaching. He is the level three coach of Madhya Pradesh.

1972 births
Living people
Indian cricketers
India One Day International cricketers
Central Zone cricketers
Madhya Pradesh cricketers
Cricketers at the 1998 Commonwealth Games
Indian cricket coaches
Cricketers from Indore
Commonwealth Games competitors for India